Route 59 may refer to:

Route 59 (MTA Maryland), a bus route in Baltimore, Maryland and its suburbs
London Buses route 59
Melbourne tram route 59
SEPTA Route 59, a trackless trolley in Northeast Philadelphia
Route 59 (Metra), a train station along the BNSF Railway Line on the border of Aurora, Illinois and Naperville, Illinois

See also
List of highways numbered 59

59